The Netherlands competed at the 2013 European Track Championships in Apeldoorn, the Netherlands, from 18 October to 20 October 2013.

The Netherlands competed in 12 of the 13 disciplines. Ellen van Dijk, the strongest rider of the women's team pursuit, changed her focus from both road and track cycling to road cycling only and so did not compete at the European Championships. Because Van Dijk is the missing link in the women's team pursuit, the national coach René Wolff did not send a team for the women's team pursuit.

List of medalists

Results
Source

Sprint

Team sprint

Team pursuit

Points race

Keirin

Omnium

Madison

See also

  Netherlands at the European Track Championships
Netherlands at other cycling events in 2013
  Netherlands at the 2013 European Road Championships
  Netherlands at the 2013 UCI Road World Championships

References

2013 in Dutch sport
Netherlands at cycling events
2013 European Track Championships
Nations at the European Track Championships
Nations at sport events in 2013